Firmansyah (born November 18, 1984) is an Indonesian footballer who plays for Persepam Madura United in the Indonesia Super League.

References

External links

1984 births
Association football goalkeepers
Living people
Indonesian footballers
Liga 1 (Indonesia) players
Indonesian Premier Division players
Persija Jakarta players
PSSB Bireuen players
Persela Lamongan players
Persepam Madura Utama players